Orlinek may refer to the following places in Poland:

Orlinek, Kuyavian-Pomeranian Voivodeship
Orlinek, Podlaskie Voivodeship
Orlinek (ski jumping hill)